Central Museum is a museum situated in Indore in Madhya Pradesh state in India. It is located near the General Post Office in Indore.There are two galleries in the Museum.The artefacts exhibited in the museum range from the prehistoric to the modern era.

History
The Museum was established on October 1, 1929, used to collect and reserve the antiquities founded in the region of the former Holkar State. It is also known as Central Museum.

References

Tourist attractions in Indore
Museums in Madhya Pradesh
Museums established in 1929
Buildings and structures in Indore
1929 establishments in India